Kholosa Mthikazi Biyana (born 6 September 1994) is a South African soccer player who plays as a midfielder for Sporting de Gijón and the South Africa women's national team.

References

External links
Kholosa Biyana at BDFutbol

1994 births
Living people
South African women's soccer players
Women's association football midfielders
Sporting de Gijón (women) players
South Africa women's international soccer players
2019 FIFA Women's World Cup players